Lo. Def Pressure is the twelfth solo album by American composer Bill Laswell, released on October 3, 2000 by Sub Rosa.

Track listing

Personnel 
Adapted from the Lo. Def Pressure liner notes.
Musicians
Hassan Akber Ali – instruments
Zakir Hussain – percussion
Bill Laswell – bass guitar, keyboards, drum programming, producer
Badal Roy – percussion
Arif Singh – instruments
Kadri Sriram – instruments
Technical personnel
Michael Fossenkemper – mastering
Robert Musso – engineering

Release history

References

External links 
 Lo. Def Pressure at Bandcamp
 

2000 albums
Bill Laswell albums
Albums produced by Bill Laswell
Sub Rosa Records albums